Liam Boyle is a hurler who played with Ballyduff and Kerry. His family are involved in hurling and football in North Kerry, and he has played both football and hurling with Kerry.

Club

Hurling
With Ballyduff Boyle won a County Senior Championship in 2006 when they beat Causeway 1-17 to 1-11 to give Ballyduff title since 1995, he added a second in 2010. He also won Minor County Championships in 1996 and 1998.

Football
Boyle was a member of the Ballyduff side that won back to back North Kerry Senior Football Championship title in 2005 and 2006 when they over came Listowel Emmets in both finals.

Inter-county

Hurling
Boyle is a member of the Kerry Senior hurling team and has also played Minor and U21 for Kerry. In 2003 he played in Croke Park in the National Hurling League Div 2 final only to lose out to Antrim by 3-18 to 3-12. He was the team caption in 2007 after Ballyduff County Championship win in 2006.

Football
Boyle was a member of the Kerry Minor team in 1998 and won a Munster Championship medal that year. He also played U21 with the county.

Honours
Club hurling

Kerry Senior Hurling Championship 4: 2006, 2010–12
County Minor Championship 2: 1996, 1998
North Kerry Senior Hurling Championship 3: 2000, 2004, 2006

Club football

North Kerry Senior Football Championship 2: 2005, 2006

Intercounty hurling

Kerry Caption: 2007

Intercounty football

Munster Minor Championship 1: 1998

External links
http://www.sportsfile.com/id/291052/

 

Year of birth missing (living people)
Living people
Ballyduff (Kerry) Gaelic footballers
Ballyduff (Kerry) hurlers
Dual players
Kerry inter-county Gaelic footballers
Kerry inter-county hurlers